The 2017–18 Seattle U Redhawks women's basketball team represents Seattle University during the 2017–18 NCAA Division I women's basketball season. The Redhawks, led by second year head coach Suzy Barcomb, play their home games at the Connolly Center and were members of the Western Athletic Conference. They finished the season 18–15, 9–5 in WAC play to finish in a tie for third place. They won the WAC women's tournament for the first time in school history by defeating Cal State Bakersfield to earn an automatic trip to their first NCAA women's tournament where they lost to Oregon in the first round.

Roster

Schedule

|-
!colspan=9 style=| Exhibition

|-
!colspan=9 style=| Non-conference regular season

|-
!colspan=9 style=| WAC regular season

|-
!colspan=9 style=| WAC Women's Tournament

|-
!colspan=9 style=| NCAA Women's Tournament

See also
 2017–18 Seattle Redhawks men's basketball team

References

Seattle Redhawks women's basketball seasons
Seattle
Seattle Redhawks
Seattle Redhawks
Seattle